is a Japanese former hurdler and currently a professional keirin cyclist. He represented Japan at the 2004 Olympics in the 400 metres hurdles.  He also ran in the 2001 and 2003 IAAF World Championships in Athletics.

By virtue of his competing in a rare 300 metres hurdles race in Sheffield in 2002, he is ranked in the all-time top 25 of the event.

International competition

References

External links

Ken Yoshizawa at JAAF  (archived)
Ken Yoshizawa at JOC 
Ken Yoshizawa at Keirin.jp

1978 births
Living people
Olympic athletes of Japan
Japanese male hurdlers
Athletes (track and field) at the 2004 Summer Olympics
Universiade medalists in athletics (track and field)
Athletes (track and field) at the 2002 Asian Games
Universiade bronze medalists for Japan
Asian Games competitors for Japan
Medalists at the 2001 Summer Universiade
Competitors at the 1999 Summer Universiade
Competitors at the 2001 Summer Universiade
Japanese male cyclists